Sweet Chalybeate is an unincorporated community in Alleghany County, Virginia, United States. It is located directly across the state-line from Sweet Springs, West Virginia. It is serviced by Virginia State Route 311.

Sweet Chalybeate Springs was added to the National Register of Historic Places in 1974.

References

GNIS reference

External links
"Taking the Waters: 19th Century Medicinal Springs: Red Sweet Springs." Claude Moore Health Sciences Library, University of Virginia

Unincorporated communities in Virginia
Unincorporated communities in Alleghany County, Virginia